The relative strength of two systems of formal logic can be defined via model theory.

See also
 Abstract logic
 Lindström's theorem

References

Model theory 
Mathematical logic
Concepts in logic